Brandon Lee (1965–1993) was an American martial artist, actor, and the son of Bruce Lee.

Brandon Lee may also refer to:
Brandon Lee (pornographic actor) (born 1979), American pornographic actor
Brandon Lee (rugby league) (born 1964), Australian rugby league footballer
"Brandon Lee", a song by the 69 Eyes from Blessed Be
Brandon Lee (student), real name Brian MacKinnon, adult who posed as a student at Bearsden Academy, Scotland in 1993
Brandun Lee (born 1999), American professional boxer

Lee, Brandon